was one of the first modern commercial shipyards in Japan, and was active in the early Meiji period. It was located in what is now part of Kobe, Japan.

History
Onohama Shipyards was established by Edward Charles Kirby, a British expatriate merchant during late Bakumatsu period and early Meiji period Japan. Kirby came to Japan in 1865, as soon as the country ended its national isolation policy and was opened to foreign trade, and established a chandlery, Kirby & Co in the foreign settlement at Yokohama. He later opened a branch in Kobe.

In 1869, together with two British partners, Robert Huggin and John Taylor, he established the Kobe Iron Works on the Ikuta River about a mile from the foreign settlement, which had an iron foundry, blacksmiths, and a deepwater dock.

In 1878, Kirby bought out his partners and established the Onohama Shipyards, bringing his brother Alfred from Karachi as engineering director. The company engaged in repair work, marine salvage, and built small vessels. However, due to problems with financing, and delays in completion of Yamato caused when suppliers in the UK went on strike, Kirby faced foreclosure on a 50,000 Mexican dollar loan from the Hong Kong & Shanghai Bank, and committed suicide in 1883.

After Kirby's death, the company survived under Japanese government receivership, coming under the control of the Kure Naval Arsenal in 1890. Louis-Émile Bertin, the French naval engineer and senior foreign advisor to the Meiji government and director of the Yokosuka Naval Arsenal recommended that the shipyard concentrate on the production of torpedo boats. In 1893, the name “Onohama Shipyards” was dropped, and the facility as designated a branch of the Kure Naval Arsenal until it was closed in 1895.

References
Ennas, Peter. Opening a Window to the West: The Foreign Concession at Kobe, Japan, 1868-1899. University of Toronto Press (2013). , pages 165-166

Shipbuilding companies of Japan
Defunct companies of Japan
Defunct defense companies of Japan
Japan–United Kingdom relations
Imperial Japanese Navy